The Mercedes-Benz W187 is a luxury car produced by Mercedes-Benz from 1951 to 1955. Introduced at the Frankfurt Motor Show in April 1951, the W187 was powered by a single overhead camshaft inline six-cylinder M180 engine and available as a saloon, coupé, and cabriolet, all designated with the 220 model name.

Despite its pre-World War II reputation as a manufacturer of luxury cars, in the immediate post-war years Mercedes-Benz produced only four-cylinder-engined passenger cars. The W187 Mercedes-Benz 220 and flagship W186 Mercedes-Benz 300 Adenauer introduced together in 1951 were the first Mercedes to once again feature six-cylinder engines.

History

Models
The styling was similar to that of the Mercedes-Benz 170S except that the 170's freestanding headlights were for the 220 integrated into the fenders for a slightly more modern look. Two different cabriolet models were built, conceived as exclusive sporting cars of exclusive character, but these only sold 1,278 and 997 for the "A" (2-door, 2/3-seat) and "B" (2-door, 4-seat) versions, respectively.

In December 1953, just as the saloon and cabriolet "B" models were about to be replaced, a "Cabriolet A" derived W187 Coupé was announced for 1954. The Mercedes-Benz sales department let it be known that this development was a direct response to pressing requests from leading celebrities of the time. During 1953 the manufacturer replaced the conventionally flat windscreen on the 2/3 seater "Cabriolet A" with a slightly curved screen, which also found its way on to the new coupé: this was a way of highlighting the sporting nature of both models. Nevertheless, the coupé once fitted, as many were, with a steel sunroof, was at the end of 1953 offered for 22,000 Marks which was nearly twice the price for the standard W187 "Limousine", and only 85 of the W187 coupés were actually sold.

Between August 1952 and May 1953, 41 special soft top OTP (Offener Tourenwagen Polizei, "Open Police Touring Car") bodied W187 220s were produced for the West German police.

Engines
All 220s used newly developed M180 six cylinder 2195cc engine producing 80 hp DIN (86 SAE) (59 kW). In contrast with the rather old fashioned look of the car's body, the new engines attracted much attention in the motoring press, being the first new engine presented by Mercedes-Benz in more than ten years. The valves were operated by short rocker arms from an overhead camshaft. The engine was unusual in Europe at this time in having oversquare cylinder dimensions with a bore of 80.0mm and a stroke of only 72.8mm, which facilitated the design of an efficient reverse-flow cylinder head. The manufacturer claimed a top speed of 140 km/h (87 mph) for the saloons and 145 km/h (90 mph) for the cabriolets which was faster than the 52 PS (38 kW) powered 170S Cabriolet which the cabriolet version of the W187 replaced and from which its bodywork was derived. The new six-cylinder engine would form the basis, repeatedly enlarged and upgraded as the years went on, for a long line of six-cylinder engines powering mainstream Mercedes-Benz models including the six-cylinder version of the early S-Class models in the 1970s.

Because of the extra power in what was, by modern standards, a heavy car, the W187 was equipped with Duplex drum brakes.

With the sedan/saloon bodied cars about to be delisted by the manufacturer in May 1954, in April 1954 the "Cabriolet A" and its Coupé derivative were fitted with a new higher compression 85 PS (63 kW) engine that had been developed for the soon to be announced Ponton bodied Mercedes-Benz W180. These faster sporting versions of the W187 continued in production for a further year.

The 220 saloon was replaced by the W105/W180 line in 1953. The coupé and cabriolet continued until August 1955.

Production
The saloon went out of production in May, 1954; the Cabriolet A and Coupé models continued for another 15 months until August 1955.

The body of the W187 saloon was closely modelled on the 1938 Mercedes-Benz W153, and despite the modern engine that powered it, already looked old fashioned to many observers on the day it was introduced. Two years earlier, in 1949, the Borgward Hansa had served notice that car design had moved on since the 1930s, and the manufacturer's own 1953 W120 confirmed that "modern" European cars were following the North American trend to lower wider bodied designs. This has been seen as an explanation for the W187's own unusually short production run of slightly above three years for the saloon and less than five years for the longest lived of the Cabriolet models.

The W187 was immediately replaced with the Ponton bodied six cylinder Mercedes-Benz 220a (W180). When the cabriolet was withdrawn in 1955 there was no immediate successor. However, just over a year later the all-new Mercedes-Benz 220S Cabriolet and Coupé appeared, in July and October 1956 respectively. As with the saloon on which they were based, the new Cabriolet and Coupé used a modern ponton style body.

Specifications

Timeline

See also
 Mercedes-Benz 170S

References

Notes

Bibliography

References

External links

 Mercedes Benz 170220 Club Website
 Mercedes Benz 170220 Club Forum

W187
W187
Cars introduced in 1951
Rear-wheel-drive vehicles
Full-size vehicles
Luxury vehicles
Sedans
Convertibles
Coupés
Limousines